Scouting in Iran is served by

 the Iran Scout Organization

and was previously served by

 the Dokhtarān-e Pīshāhang-e Īrān (Iranian Scouting Girl Scout Section)